The Coalition for a New Paraguay (Concertación), also known as Concertación 2023 or Concertación Opositora, is a coalition of Paraguayan political parties opposed to the ruling ANR-PC, formed in 2022.

The Concertación will hold internal elections on December 18 where the candidates for governorship and the presidential duo will be defined.

Members

References

Political party alliances in Paraguay
Political parties established in 2022